Andrew Neilson (born 15 June 1974 in Vernon, British Columbia) is a Canadian snowboarder who currently resides in North Vancouver, British Columbia. Neilson was a member of the Canadian national snowboard team and competes in snowboard cross.

Neilson was the overall snowboard cross champion in the world cup season of 2006-07. Over the course of his career he has won 9 world cup races and been on the podium 19 times all in the division of snowboard cross. Neilson's best result came at the 2003 FIS World Championships where he finished in the bronze medal position. Neilson went to the 2006 Turin Olympics where he only managed a 17th-place finish. Neilson had gone into those games as the gold medal favourite but was taken out in the early rounds of competition by another boarder. His close friend Seth Wescott went on to win the gold medal at the inaugural Olympic event.

The 2010 Winter Olympics took place in Neilson's home of Vancouver. The location of the snowboard cross for the Olympics was just north of his North Vancouver home. Cypress Mountain was also the site which nearly ended Neilson's career, when he broke his arm biking down the mountain. Neilson finished in 7th place in the World Cup and only snowboard cross competition at the site before the 2010 games.

Neilson is a playable character in the video game Shaun Palmer's Pro Snowboarder.

References

External links
 National Team Profile
 CTV Olympic Profile
 FIS Biography

Canadian male snowboarders
Olympic snowboarders of Canada
Snowboarders at the 2006 Winter Olympics
Snowboarders at the 2010 Winter Olympics
Sportspeople from Vernon, British Columbia
Sportspeople from North Vancouver
1974 births
Living people